= Stomagram =

Method of oral communications

A stomagram (Greek: stoma "mouth," -gram "drawing"), is a (typically side-view) pictogram representation of a human mouth, for the sake of diagramming its state during speech as particular sounds are made. Stomagrams may be cut-away images or simple written character forms, representing the degree the mouth is opened, the position of the lips, and the placement or movement of the tongue.
